The 1937 Purdue Boilermakers football team was an American football team that represented Purdue University during the 1937 Big Ten Conference football season.  In their first season under head coach Allen Elward, the Boilermakers compiled a 4–3–1 record, finished in a tie for sixth place in the Big Ten Conference with a 2–2–1 record against conference opponents, and outscored opponents by a total of 83 to 69.

Schedule

References

Purdue
Purdue Boilermakers football seasons
Purdue Boilermakers football